In the Running is the fifth album by British pop musician Howard Jones, released in 1992. It was his last original studio album recorded on the Warner/Elektra label. It contains the US Top 40 hit "Lift Me Up". An acoustic tour took place in 1992 with Howard on grand piano, accompanied by Carol Steele on percussion.

The album was remastered and released on CD (with a host of extra tracks) in 2012, with another reissue in 2021.

Production
David Lindley and Midge Ure were among the guitar players who played on In the Running. Jones worked on the album for three years.

Critical reception

Rolling Stone wrote: "If Jones once wrote catchy pop songs, he's now drifting into intricate orchestration, slick production and melodrama." The Chicago Tribune noted that "Jones aims for social statements as a catharsis for change, but the lyrical territory is well-trodden." The Washington Post deemed the album "mainstream, mid-tempo pop-rock."

Track listing
All tracks composed by Howard Jones; except where indicated.
"Lift Me Up" (Jones, Ross Cullum) – 3:39
"Fallin' Away" (Jones, Ross Cullum, Lala) – 6:53
"Show Me" (Jones, Ross Cullum) – 4:32
"The Voices Are Back" – 5:32
"Exodus" – 4:32
"Tears To Tell" – 5:23
"Two Souls" (Jones, Andy Ross, Ross Cullum) – 4:23
"Gun Turned On The World" – 4:38
"One Last Try" – 4:11
"City Song" – 7:17

2021 Remaster 
Bonus tracks:

11. I. G. Y. (What A Beautiful World) (Single Mix)

12. New Man

13. Takin’ The Time

14. You Say

15. One Last Try (Edit)*

* Previously Unreleased

CD Two

 Lift Me Up (Instrumental)*
 Fallin’ Away (Instrumental)*
 Show Me (Instrumental)*
 The Voices Are Back (Instrumental)*
 Exodus (Instrumental)*
 Tears To Tell (Instrumental)*
 Two Souls(Instrumental)*
 Gun Turned On The World (Instrumental) (Extended Version)*
 One Last Try (Instrumental) (Extended Version)*
 City Song (Instrumental)*
 I.G.Y. (What A Beautiful World) (Instrumental)*
 Road To Cairo (Tv Mix)*
 Other People Are Us (Tv Mix)*
 What Is Love? (’93 Remix) (Instrumental)*

* Previously Unreleased

CD Three

 What Is Love? (’93 12″ Remix Part 1)*
 What Is Love? (’93 12″ Remix Part 2)*
 Tears To Tell (7″ Edit)**
 Don’t Be Part Of It
 Road To Cairo (Andy Scarth Mix)**
 I. G. Y. (What A Beautiful World) (Special Dj Edit)**
 Other People Are Us
 What Is Love? (’93 Remix)*
 Two Souls (Early Extended Mix)*
 Don’t Be Part Of It (Moo Mix)**
 I. G. Y. (What A Beautiful World) (Live At The Spectrum Theatre, Philadelphia 1987)**
 Road To Cairo**
 Tears To Tell (Early Mix)*
 One Last Try (Extended Version)*
 Don’t Be Part Of It (Dance Mix Aka Dub Mix)**

* Previously Unreleased

** Previously Unreleased Remastered

DVD Four:

1. Interview With Howard Jones October 2020:

 Creating “In The Running”
 Track By Track Commentary

2.  I.G.Y. (What A Beautiful World) (Pebble Mill – 18/05/1993)

3. What Is Love? (Pebble Mill – 18/05/1993)

4. Tears To Tell (Promo Video)

5. Lift Me Up (Promo Video)

6.  I.G.Y. (What A Beautiful World) (Promo Video)

7. Tears To Tell (Blue Tint Version) (Promo Video)

Personnel 
 Howard Jones – vocals, acoustic piano, keyboards (1–4, 6–10), keyboard bass (1, 2, 4, 5, 7–10), keyboard guitar (1–4, 7, 8, 10), vocoder (5), organ (5, 6), backing vocals (5), bass guitar (6), drums (10)
 Jai Winding – additional keyboards (3, 7), Moog bass (3)
 Kevin Maloney – Synclavier editing (7)
 Ian Stanley – additional keyboards (8)
 Dean Parks – electric guitar (2), guitar (5), soft wah wah guitar (9)
 David Lindley – slide guitar (2), acoustic guitar (2)
 Steve Farris – guitar (3, 5, 7, 8)
 Neil Taylor – guitar solo (3)
 Robbie McIntosh – guitar (6)
 Midge Ure – "breakdown" guitar (7)
 Andy Ross – wah wah guitar (7), additional guitar (7), rhythm arrangements (7)
 Ross Cullum – drums (1, 2, 3, 10), guitar solo (9)
 Mark Brzezicki – additional percussion (2), additional drums (3)
 Chris Hughes – drums (4, 6, 8)
 Richie Hayward – drums (5, 7)
 Sam Clayton – tambourine (5)
 Luis Conte – percussion (7, 9)
 Kevin Robinson – trumpet (4)
 Clare Fischer – clarinet choir and brass arrangement (9)
 Sooty Bonnet – blues mordents (1)
 Carol Kenyon – backing vocals (1, 2, 4–7), choir (10)
 Tessa Niles – backing vocals (1, 2, 4–7), choir (10)

Production
 Producers – Howard Jones and Ross Cullum
 Executive Producer – Rupert Hine
 Recorded by Ross Cullum
 Assistant Engineer – Chad Munsey
 Additional Engineers – Paul Corkett, Andy Strange and Steve Williams.
 Recorded at The Shed (Maidenhead, England) and A&M Studios (Hollywood, CA).
 Mixed by Bob Clearmountain at Mayfair Studios (London, England).
 Mix Assistant – Avril Mackintosh
 Mastered by Bob Ludwig at Masterdisk (New York, NY).
 Art Direction and Design – Janet Boye
 Photography – Daniel Miller

References

Howard Jones (English musician) albums
1992 albums
Elektra Records albums